Buncrana is a town in County Donegal, Ireland. In the 2016 census, the population was 6,785 making it the second most populous town in County Donegal, after Letterkenny, and the largest in Inishowen.

Buncrana is the historic home of the O'Doherty clan and originally developed around the defensive tower known as O'Doherty's Keep at the mouth of the River Crana. The town moved to its present location just south of the River Crana when George Vaughan built the main street in 1718.

The town was a major centre for the textile industry in County Donegal from the 19th century until the mid-2000s (decade).

History

O'Doherty's Keep

On the northern bank of the River Crana as it enters Lough Swilly sits the three-storey O'Doherty's Keep, which is the only surviving part of an original 14th-century Norman castle. The first two levels of the keep were built after 1333. In 1601 the O'Doherty's Keep was described as being a small, two-storey castle, inhabited by Conor McGarret O'Doherty. In 1602 the third level was added and it was upgraded by Hugh Boy O'Doherty as an intended base for Spanish military aid that hoped to land at Inch.

The keep was burned by Crown forces in 1608 in reprisal for the rebellion of Sir Cahir O'Doherty, who had sacked and razed the city of Derry. After Sir Cahir O'Doherty was killed at the Battle of Kilmacrennan, he was attaindered and his land seized. The keep was granted to Sir Arthur Chichester, who then leased it to Englishman Henry Vaughan, where it was repaired and lived in by the Vaughan family until 1718.

In 1718, Buncrana Castle was built by George Vaughan, it was one of the first big manor houses built in Inishowen, and stone was taken from the bawn, or defensive wall, surrounding O'Doherty's Keep to build it. It was erected on the original site of Buncrana, which had grown up in the shadow of the keep. Vaughan moved the town to its present location, where he founded the current main street and built the Castle Bridge (a six-arched stone single lane bridge) across the River Crana leading to his Castle.

During the 1798 Rebellion, Theobald Wolfe Tone was held in Buncrana Castle when he was captured after the British/French naval battle off the coast of Donegal, before being taken to Derry and then subsequently to Dublin. On 18 May 1812, Isaac Todd bought the entire town of Buncrana, also the townlands of Tullydish, Adaravan and Ballymacarry, at the Court of Chancery on behalf of the trustees of the Marquess of Donegall. His nephews inherited the castles, and they later became known as the Thornton-Todds. The castle remains as a private home today. In the forecourt there is a memorial rock in honour of Sir Cahir O'Doherty, and a plaque dedicated to Wolfe Tone.

One of the oldest remaining inhabited residences in Buncrana is a Georgian property called Westbrook House, situated at the entrance to Swan Park just north of the town centre of Buncrana. The house was built in 1807 by Judge Wilson, who also built the single-arch stone bridge (referred to as Wilson's Bridge) leading to the house and the entrance to Swan Park.

19th century 

The town was often the focal point for unrest in the surrounding areas as rural peasants protested against evictions and rent increases. In 1834, unrest broke out when local residents tried to expel various landlord agents from the area. The names of individual agents were posted on the church doors in Buncrana by a "Captain Wright" warning that the agents risked death if they continued to live in the area. The unrest forced the administration in Dublin Castle to station troops in the towns of Buncrana, Clonmany and Carndonagh.

Communal relations between Protestant and Catholic communities were tense and on occasions led to violence. In  November 1833, communal tensions broke out. The houses of local Protestants were attacked and the windows of their houses were smashed.

During the second half of the 19th century, the town developed a significant tourism industry. Tourists, particularly from Derry, were able to access the town through the Londonderry and Lough Swilly Railway.

20th century

In October 1905, Buncrana was the first town in County Donegal to receive electricity. It was generated at Swan Mill which continued to provide electricity for the town until September 1954 when Buncrana was brought under the ESB Rural Electrification Scheme.

On 30 July 1922, during the Irish Civil War, Buncrana was captured by the Free State forces from Republican forces without the loss of life. The Free State forces held the railway station, telephone and telegraph offices and all the roads entering the town. At 4:00am a sentry stopped a car on the outskirts of the town and on discovering it contained the Republican commander, with five armed volunteers, arrested them. At around 7:00am the Republican forces' position was surrounded and were given fifteen minutes to surrender. They complied, were arrested and their weapons and ammunition seized. Later that day, 100 Free State troops commandeered a train at Buncrana station and proceeded to take Clonmany, Carndonagh and other locations on the peninsula.

Buncrana was the object of public attention in 1972, when after Operation Motorman it became the place of refuge for many Provisional Irish Republican Army members from Derry. In 1991, a local Sinn Féin councillor, Eddie Fullerton, was murdered by loyalists from Northern Ireland.

In March 2016, Buncrana came to public attention when five people of the same family died after their car slipped off Buncrana Pier into the waters of Lough Swilly. Only a 4-month-old baby girl survived when the driver, Sean McGrotty, passed his daughter through a window to a passer-by who swam out to help. On 23 November 2017 an inquest found that McGrotty died by 'misadventure', as the post-mortem results showed that he was more than three times over the drink drive limit.

Politics

Local
Buncrana Town Council was the Local Authority for the town and provided an extensive range of services in the area. These services ranged from planning control, the provision of social housing, the upkeep and improvement of roads, and the maintenance of parks, beaches and public open spaces. The Town Council was abolished in June 2014 when the Local Government Reform Act 2014 was implemented.  Its functions were taken over by Donegal County Council in 2014. Buncrana is in the Inishowen Municipal District, which elects councillors to Donegal County Council.

National
Buncrana is part of the Donegal (Dáil constituency) since 2016. Previously it was part of the Donegal North-East constituency of Dáil Éireann.

Geography

Buncrana is located on the eastern shore of Lough Swilly in north County Donegal. The main urban area of the town is situated between the Crana River to the north and the Mill River to the south. The principal street follows a rough north-south route and is divided into Upper and Lower Main Street by Market Square. The Main Street has a one-way traffic system. The River Crana is crossed by four bridges: Castle Bridge (which gives vehicular access to Buncrana Castle and pedestrian access to Swan Park), Westbrook Bridge (officially, Wilson's Bridge), the new Cockhill Bridge (officially opened in 2018) and the old Cockhill Bridge (now a pedestrian bridge). The Mill River, south of the town, is crossed by two bridges: Victoria Bridge (known locally as the Iron Bridge) which is the main point of access to the town and the Mill Bridge which is at the end of the Mill Brae road at the south end of the town.

Geology
The underlying bedrock includes Fahan slate formation. The river valley of the Mill River flows over a narrow band of Culdaff limestone with a sill of metadolerite along the river's southern embankment extending from the estuarine zone inland. Sandy gravels and conglomerates overlie bedrock. The geology was formed during the Lower Carboniferous Period. The local soils throughout the area range from shallow to moderate depth peaty podzols and established podzolic types with a moderate percentage of loam and sandy clays.

Climate
Buncrana, like the rest of Ireland, has a temperate oceanic climate, or Cfb on the Köppen climate classification system, characterised by cool summers and mild winters. Ireland's position in the Atlantic Ocean means that its climate is strongly influenced by the Gulf Stream, which keeps it a few degrees warmer than other locations at the same latitude.

Transport
Buncrana railway station opened on 9 September 1864, was closed for passenger traffic on 6 September 1948, and finally closed altogether on 10 August 1953.

The nearest railway station is operated by Northern Ireland Railways and runs from Londonderry railway station via Coleraine to Belfast Central railway station and Belfast Great Victoria Street railway station. The strategically important Belfast-Derry railway line is to be upgraded to facilitate more frequent trains and improvements to the permanent way such as track and signalling to enable faster services.

Buncrana is connected to the rest of the national road network via a regional road, the R238. This connects it to the N13, the national primary road that connects Letterkenny and Derry (it becomes the A2 when it crosses the border). The town is considered the gateway to Inishowen and lies on the "Inishowen 100", an approximate 100-mile route around the peninsula that passes various scenic sites.

Local bus company McGonagle Bus and Coach operates an hourly bus service from Derry to Buncrana and vice versa. The company took over the route from Lough Swilly Buses in April 2014 after Lough Swilly ceased trading. The buses run every hour at ten minutes past the Hour, each way.

Demography

The results of the 2011 Republic of Ireland census put the population of Buncrana at 6,839. The town had 2,531 private households, 25.3% were made up of one person living alone, 16.9% were couples without children, 34.9% were couples with children, 15.6% were lone parent families and 7.2% were classified as "other".

Around 90.9% of residents were recorded as Catholic, 4.3% were of another stated religion (e.g. Church of Ireland, Presbyterian, Orthodox or Islam). The percentage of residents with no religion was 4.1%.

28.8% of the town's residents were 'foreign-born'.

Of people aged 3 and over, 30.0% could speak Irish.

The percentage of people over the age of 15 whose full-time education had ceased who possessed a third-level degree (NFQ level 7 or higher) was 19.0%.

There were 3,359 males and 3,480 females in Buncrana during the 2011 census.

Tourism

Buncrana has a relatively strong tourism industry, and it is one of the most popular holiday destinations in the northwest of Ireland. This is possibly due to its close proximity to Derry, and also for its wide range of retail stores. It also has well-developed tourist facilities, and it serves as the main town on the Inishowen peninsula, which also helps with sustaining the tourism industry in the town.

Lisfannon beach, a Blue Flag beach, sits on the shores of Lough Swilly just south of the town, and is an important recreational beach that is popular with locals and day-trippers from Derry.

Sport
Buncrana is home to many sports clubs, including clubs for soccer, Gaelic football and hurling, athletics and watersports. Football clubs based around Buncrana include Buncrana Hearts F.C., Cockhill Celtic F.C. and Illies Celtic. Buncrana Hearts and Illies Celtic play in the Inishowen Football League and Cockhill Celtic play in the Ulster Senior League. Derry City F.C. currently play at Maginn Park, Buncrana.

Gaelic Football is also a popular sport in Buncrana, and the club caters for teams from Under-8 level right up to Senior level. They play their home games at the Scarvey, the team is very successful underage, winning at least two Inishowen titles the last few seasons and winning four county championships since 2000, reaching under-14 final for the past two seasons as well as the under 15s last season.

Buncrana Golf Club has the oldest 9-hole links course in Ireland.

Culture
Three buildings in Buncrana are recorded on the Record of Protected Structures, namely the Drift Inn (formerly Buncrana Railway Station), Buncrana Castle and Swan Mill.

Music

Buncrana's music scene is served by a number of local pubs and bars, which have live music several nights of the week. These include Roddens Bar, O Flaherty's and The Drift Inn, which have a mix of traditional, rock and country music. The annual Buncrana Music & Arts Festival takes place every 23 July in the town.

The Buncrana Music and Arts Festival returned to the town in 2010, after a five-year absence. The festival included successful performances from The Coronas, The Undertones and Altan. It has recurred each year since.

Media
The two main local newspapers that serve the Inishowen area, the Inish Times and the Inishowen Independent, have their offices in Buncrana. Local issues in the town and peninsula are also covered in the Derry Journal. The local radio station is Highland Radio and it is based in Letterkenny.

Buncrana receives all the Irish national television and radio stations from the Saorview television network from the local Fanad television transmitter. Due to its close proximity to Derry, before the 2012 digital switchover, the town could receive the five main UK television channels from the Derry or Limavady television transmitters from the mid-1950s.

Community

Tidy Towns
In 2012, Buncrana won a Silver medal in the national Tidy Towns Competition. The work of the Buncrana Lighthouse Restoration Project was also recognised when they received a Heritage Award.

Youth facilities
Buncrana Youth Club is open seven days a week and provides various services such as arts, sports, drama, music and computers. It also operates summer camps and provides coaching, personal development and peer education.

Buncrana Youth Drop in is located in the Plaza theatre on the Main Street and is usually open from 7pm til 10pm and provides a safe place for young people with such facilities as a pool table, internet access, TV, gaming consoles and a small shop. It also runs workshops and other youth projects.

Buncrana Youth Club and Buncrana Drop in are both affiliated with Donegal Youth Service.

BreakOUT is a lesbian, gay, bisexual and transgender (LGBT) youth organisation in County Donegal that has a local group in Buncrana. The group is open to ages from 14 to 23. The group has run various projects to promote LGBT causes in Buncrana. In 2011, positive slogans to combat homophobia were drawn on the Main Street footpath. The group meets at the Inishowen Development Partnership building on Saturdays from 7pm to 9pm.

Education
Buncrana is served by three secondary schools: Crana College, a vocational school managed by the Donegal Education and Training Board and Scoil Mhuire, Buncrana, a voluntary secondary school under the trusteeship of CEIST (Catholic Education Irish Schools Trust) and Coláiste Chineal Eoghain (an Irish language secondary school (Meanscoil) in Tullyarvan Mill). Crana College was set up in 1925, Scoil Mhuire in 1933 and Coláiste Chineál Eoghain in 2007. As of September 2011, Crana College had 540 registered students, while Scoil Mhuire had around 700. The town's has four primary schools: Scoil Íosagáin, Cockhill National School, St Mura's National School and Gaelscoil Bhun Cranncha.

Buncrana Community Library opened in 2000 in a refurbished Presbyterian church. It won the Public Library Buildings Awards 2001 for the best small library in the converted, extended or refurbished category.

People

 Ryan Bradley (Gaelic footballer), (1985 – present), 2012 All-Ireland Senior Football Championship Winner with Donegal
 Daniel Devlin, (1814 – 22 February 1867), prosperous businessman and City Chamberlain of New York City
 Hugh Doherty (footballer), (1921 – 29 September 2014), Professional Irish footballer (Celtic, Blackpool, Derry City and Dundalk)
 John Doherty, (1798–1854), radical trade unionist
 Eddie Fullerton, (1935 – 25 May 1991), Sinn Féin councillor assassinated by the Ulster Defence Association
 Danny Hutton, (born 10 September 1942), singer with Three Dog Night and head of Hanna-Barbera Records from 1965 – 1966
 Pádraig Mac Lochlainn, politician
 Ray McAnally, (30 March 1926 – 15 June 1989), actor whose filmography includes The Mission, My Left Foot, and A Very British Coup
 Michael McCorkell, (3 May 1925 – 13 November 2006), Lord Lieutenant of County Londonderry
 Frank McGuinness, (born 29 July 1953), playwright and poet whose work includes Observe the Sons of Ulster Marching Towards the Somme
 Patrick Stone, (14 March 1854 – 23 December 1926), member of the Western Australian Legislative Assembly
 Mark Timlin, (17 November 1994 – Present), Professional footballer (Derry City and St Patrick's Athletic)

International relations

Twin towns – Sister cities
Buncrana is twinned with two towns. It twinned with Campbellsville, Kentucky as both towns had a large Fruit of the Loom plant. The plant was a large source of employment in Buncrana before it moved its operations overseas to Morocco. Buncrana is twinned with the following towns:

See also
 List of populated places in Ireland
 Buncrana Hearts F.C.
 List of RNLI stations

References

External links

 VisitBuncrana.com Website
 Buncrana.com Website

 
Towns and villages in County Donegal